Korowa Anglican Girls' School is an independent, Anglican, day school for girls, located in Glen Iris, a suburb of Melbourne, Victoria, Australia.

Established in Malvern in 1890, Korowa is a non-selective school and currently caters for approximately 689 students, ranging from the Early Learning Centre (three- and four-year-olds) to Year 12s completing the Victorian Certificate of Education (VCE).

The school is a member of the Association of Heads of Independent Schools of Australia (AHISA), the Independent Primary School Heads of Australia (IPHSA), the Association of Independent Schools of Victoria (AISV), the Alliance of Girls' Schools Australasia (AGSA), and a founding member of Girls Sport Victoria (GSV).

Korowa consistently places in the top 10 academic performing schools in Melbourne and greater Victoria. In 2019, the school ranked 6th in Victoria based on the median VCE study score of 37. After completing their VCE studies, many students enrol in competitive  degrees offered at both the University of Melbourne and Monash University.

History
Korowa Anglican Girls' School was established in 1890, first in two houses in Valetta Street, Malvern and then in an old house in Pine Grove. In 1900 the school moved again, this time to a two-storey house in Wattletree Road. The school was registered as "School No.5" in 1906.

Korowa relocated to its current site in Glen Iris in 1914. The residence was the former property of the Hon. William Knox, MHR, who named the home 'Ranfurlie' - which is now the name of the Crescent in which the school is located. The school was officially named Corowa in 1899, but later changed to Korowa to avoid confusion with the township of Corowa in 1890. From 1910 to 1918 Korowa was a Presbyterian school for girls', then in 1919 was incorporated by the diocesan authorities as a Church of England grammar school.

When the Diocese of Melbourne adopted the title 'Anglican' instead of Church of England in 1982, it was decided that the church connection should be retained in the name, and subsequently the school has since been known as "Korowa Anglican Girls' School".

Principals

House System

Curriculum

Early Learning Centre
The school's Early Learning Centre (ELC) comprises a 3-year-olds program, where students can attend either a full-time or part-time program; and a 4-year-old program, where children attend for either 4 or 5 days. Reception children wear a school uniform and attend school functions and celebrations. All ELC children take part in specialist classes such as art, music, Languages Other Than English (LOTE) and library. Along with these subjects, children participate in a Perpetual Motor/Physical Education Program.

Junior School 
The Junior School covers Prep to Year 5. Curriculum is divided into the key learning areas of English, Mathematics, Social Studies, Science and Technology, Personal and Social Education and Information & Communication Technology (ICT). Specialist teachers are responsible for Art, Languages (German and French, commencing in Prep in alternate years), Library, Music, Religious Education, Physical Education and Sport. These learning areas are supported by studies in Speech and Drama, Literature and a Perceptual Motor Program.

Middle school 
The middle school aims to develop competent, proactive learners who are equipped to embrace change. Serving Years 6-8, the middle school is located in the custom-designed "Cripps Centre". Year 6 is the entry year for the notebook computer program. In the Middle School, girls study the traditional subjects as well as a range of specialist subjects. Students also have the opportunity to study LOTE (including Chinese, French, German and Japanese). Korowa's middle school offers a unique curriculum with two Korowa only subjects, 'Approaches to Learning' and 'Sense Cycles'. The program aims to give students the ability to understand the world around them, and learn more about themselves.

In the middle school they have been learning about good health and wellbeing during personal development, sense cycles and approaches to learning. In these subjects they learn about the habits of mind. In term 4 they focus on sexual reproduction and puberty which is a good time to talk about their changes in their bodies.

Senior School
Korowa's Senior School, Years 9-12, aims to prepare students for success in the Victorian Certificate of Education (VCE) and Beyond.

The Year 9 and 10 curriculum provides a strong foundation for the Victorian Certificate of Education (VCE). Students study the traditional core subjects as well as selecting from a wide range of elective subjects including Accounting, Art, Dance, Biology, Chemistry, Drama, Music Performance, Maths, Legal studies, Literature, Psychology, Physics, Theatre Studies, Religious Education and Renaissance History, in addition to first year university studies and Vocational Education and Training (VET) subjects.

Facilities 
Korowa benefits from a pleasant and compact campus to cater for all areas of study and interests.

Korowa has modern, dedicated buildings for the Junior, Middle and Senior Schools. In addition, the school has refurbished Junior and Senior libraries and a Visual Art Centre which caters for the full spectrum of art subjects. Students in Years 11 and 12 have their own VCE Centre which includes study areas, a cafe and theatrette. The school also houses a redeveloped Science Wing, Food Technology Centre and Information Resource Centre.

Other facilities include a Music School, drama studios, a vast Assembly Hall, two gymnasia, a 25m heated indoor swimming pool, a grassed oval, tennis and netball/basketball courts and well tended gardens and playgrounds.

Sport 
Korowa is a member of Girls Sport Victoria (GSV).

GSV premierships 
Korowa has won the following GSV premierships.

 Softball (4) - 2003, 2005, 2011, 2012
 Tennis (2) - 2007, 2015
 Triathlon, Sprint (3) - 2016, 2017, 2018
 Water Polo (3) - 2002, 2003, 2004

Beyond the Classroom 
At Korowa, formal exchange programs are arranged so that students can gain a deeper insight into everyday life in another country while enhancing their language skills. Senior students can spend time at the end of each year in France, Germany, China or Japan, staying with host families, participating in excursions and attending school. Students are also encouraged to travel broadly through participation in other organised exchanges and travel opportunities.

Health and wellbeing is highly regarded at Korowa. Physical Education is a compulsory subject from 3-year-old Beginners through to Year 10, after which it is undertaken by choice. As a member of Girls Sport Victoria, Korowa encourages participation in a wide range of sports.

Outdoor Education is an important part of the overall education of students at Korowa. Outdoor Education provides girls with a range of activities outside their usual environment, so that they learn to face challenges in an atmosphere which requires self-reliance and independence. School Camps begin from Year 2 at Korowa.

In Year 9, girls leave the Korowa campus for five weeks and take part in one of two programs - the 'Korowa Trek' or 'Urban Connect'. Students choose between journeying through the Victorian Alps by foot, bike and canoe; or spending time in city, urban, regional and country places, where students are taken outside their comfort zone to explore the self and connect with the wider community.

Year 9 students also have the opportunity to lead the House Arts Festival. This festival provides a performance outlet for musicians, actors and dancers. Students are responsible for the entire project, including the writing of scripts, choreography of dance routines and arrangement, allocating and performing acting roles as well as the performance of choral and instrumental pieces.

Co curricular Activities 
With around 700 students, Korowa has the advantage of being able to offer all children a wide range of educational opportunities and activities whilst being able to value each child for their individual talents and personality.

Korowa offers a range of co curricular activities including life drawing, music, performing arts, debating, speech and drama classes and chess.

Notable alumnae 
All Korowa alumnae are members of the school's alumni association, the 'Korovian Club'. Meetings and social functions are held during the year for past Korowa students. Some notable 'Korovians' include:

 Penelope Blackmore - rhythmic gymnast
 Eva Duldig - tennis player; played in Wimbledon, the Maccabiah Games,  and in Fed Cup for Australia
 Kerrie Engel, Paralympic swimmer
 Dorothy Gibson - teacher, Communist, and peace activist
 Bella Heathcote - actress
 Hannah MacDougall - Paralympic swimming medalist
 Mary Owen, activist
 Sally Peers - Wimbledon Junior Doubles Champion 2009
 Marina Prior - opera singer
 Pauline Neura Reilly - author and ornithologist
 Rowena Webster - water polo player

Notable faculty
Margaret Blackwood, botanist and geneticist
Slawa Duldig (1901–1975), Austrian-Australian inventor, artist, interior designer, and teacher
 Norma Redpath, sculptor

See also 
 Anglican Church of Australia
 Victorian Certificate of Education
 List of schools in Victoria

References

External links 
 Korowa AGS website

Girls' schools in Victoria (Australia)
Educational institutions established in 1890
Anglican schools in Melbourne
Junior School Heads Association of Australia Member Schools
1890 establishments in Australia
Alliance of Girls' Schools Australasia
Buildings and structures in the City of Stonnington